Aeolochroma turneri is a moth of the family Geometridae first described by Thomas Pennington Lucas in 1890. It is found in Australia's Northern Territory and Queensland.

The wingspan is about 30 mm. Adults have a complex brown pattern with a greenish tinge.

References

Moths described in 1890
Pseudoterpnini
Moths of Australia